Bishkurayevo (Bişquray) is a rural locality (a selo) and the administrative centre of Bishkurayevsky Selsoviet, Tuymazinsky District, Bashkortostan, Russia. The population was 680 as of 2010. There are 7 streets.

Geography 
Bishkurayevo is located 39 km east of Tuymazy (the district's administrative centre) by road. Yermunchino is the nearest rural locality.

References 

Rural localities in Tuymazinsky District